The 15th season of Taniec z Gwiazdami, the Polish edition of Dancing With the Stars format, started on 5 September 2014. This is the second season aired on Polsat. Krzysztof Ibisz and Anna Głogowska returned as hosts and Beata Tyszkiewicz, Iwona Pavlović, Michał Malitowski and Andrzej Grabowski returned as judges.

On 14 November, Agnieszka Sienkiewicz and her partner Stefano Terrazzino were crowned the champions. With four wins, Terrazzino is currently the most successful professional dancer in history of the show. He also won second season of the show in the row.

Couples

Scores

Red numbers indicate the lowest score for each week.
Green numbers indicate the highest score for each week.
 indicates the couple eliminated that week.
 indicates the returning couple that finished in the bottom two.
 indicates the returning couple that was the last to be called safe.
 indicates the couple saved from elimination by immunity
 indicates the winning couple.
 indicates the runner-up.
 indicates the couple in third place.

Notes:

Week 1: Anna Wyszkoni scored 39 out of 40 on her first dance (Salsa). Agnieszka Sienkiewicz also scored 39 out of 40 on her first dance (Contemporary). There were the highest score ever in Week 1. Michał Koterski got 24 points for his Viennese Waltz, making it the lowest score of the week. Marta & Łukasz were eliminated despite being 1 points from the bottom.

Week 2: Anna Wyszkoni got 38 points for her Tango, making it the highest score of the week. Michał Koterski got 20 points for his Cha-cha-cha, making it the lowest score of the week and his lowest score ever. Honorata & Kamil were eliminated despite being 10 points from the bottom.

Week 3: All couples danced to Latin songs. Marcelina Zawadzka got 39 points for her Rumba, making it the highest score of the week. Michał Koterski got 24 points for his Salsa, making it the lowest score of the week. Artur & Valeriya were eliminated despite being 2 points from the bottom.

Week 4: Anna Wyszkoni got 39 points for her Rumba, making it the highest score of the week. Michał Koterski got 21 points for his Swing, making it the lowest score of the week. Joanna & Przemysław were eliminated despite being 4 points from the bottom.

Week 5: Anna Wyszkoni got 39 points for her American Smooth, making it the highest score of the week. Agnieszka Sienkiewicz also got 39 points for her Paso Doble. Michał Koterski got 23 points for his Tango, making it the lowest score of the week. There were two team dance. The teams were chosen by the winner and runner-up couples in 4th episode – Anna & Jan and Agnieszka & Stefano. Anna Wyszkoni and her team scored 35 points for their Latin Freestyle. Agnieszka Sienkiewicz and her team scored 36 points for their Latin Freestyle. Michał & Janja were eliminetaed.

Week 6: The couples were required to switch professional partners this week and learn a new style of dance. Anna Wyszkoni got her first perfect scores for the Cha-cha-cha. Jan Mela got 24 points for his Viennese Waltz, making it the lowest score of the week and his lowest score ever. There was no elimination this week.

Week 7: Marcelina Zawadzka got 37 points for her Jive, making it the highest score of the week. Anna Wyszkoni also got 37 points for her Contemporary. Jan Mela got 24 points for his Argentine Tango, making it the lowest score of the week and his lowest score ever. There were also Rock and Roll Marathon. Mateusz Banasiuk got 7 points for this dance, making the highest score of the Rock and Roll marathon. Marcin & Nina were eliminated despite being 19 points from the bottom. Rafał & Agnieszka were also eliminated despite being 5 points from the bottom.

Week 8: Marcelina Zawadzka got 38 points for her Waltz, making it the highest score of the week. Jan Mela got 27 points for his Disco, making it the lowest score of the week. Agnieszka Sienkiewicz also got 27 points for her Viennese Waltz making it her lowest score ever. Jan & Magdalena were eliminated.

Week 9: Marcelina Zawadzka got two perfect scores for her Quickstep and Rumba. She got her first perfect scores ever. Anna Wyszkoni received her second perfect score for the Cha-cha-cha. Agnieszka Sienkiewicz got 31 points for her Cha-cha-cha making it the lowest score of the week. Mateusz & Hanna were eliminated despite being 4 points from the bottom.

Week 10: Agnieszka Sienkiewicz got 32 points for her Samba and Pop making it the lowest scores of the week. Anna Wyszkoni got 37 points for her Rumba and Pop making it the highest scores of the week. In Dance-Off Marcelina Zawadzka received her third perfect score for Viennese Waltz. Agnieszka Sienkiewicz received her first perfect score for the Rumba.

Week 11: Both couples had to perform three dances: their favorite dance, judges' choice dance and a Freestyle. Anna Wyszkoni got 120 out of 120 points. Anna Wyszkoni received her 3rd, 4th and 5th perfect score for  the American Smooth, Salsa and Freestyle. Agnieszka Sienkiewicz received her 2nd and 3rd perfect score for Contemporary and Freestyle. Agnieszka & Stefano won the competition. It was the 9th time the winner was not on the first place according to the judges' scoreboard. Stefano Terrazzino won the competition for the 4th time. This was also Stefano Terrazzino's second win in a row since he won the 14th season with Aneta Zając.

Average score chart 
This table only counts for dances scored on a traditional 40-points scale.

Highest and lowest scoring performances 
The best and worst performances in each dance according to the judges' 40-point scale are as follows:

Couples' highest and lowest scoring dances

According to the traditional 40-point scale:

Weekly scores
Unless indicated otherwise, individual judges scores in the charts below (given in parentheses) are listed in this order from left to right: Andrzej Grabowski, Iwona Pavlović, Beata Tyszkiewicz and Michał Malitowski.

Week 1: Season Premiere

Running order

Week 2: Love Night

Running order

Week 3: Latin Night

Running order

Week 4: Most Memorable Year

Running order

Week 5: Team Night
Individual judges scores in the chart below (given in parentheses) are listed in this order from left to right: Michał Malitowski, Beata Tyszkiewicz, Iwona Pavlović and Andrzej Grabowski.

The teams were chosen by the winner and runner-up couples in 4th episode –  Anna & Jan and Agnieszka & Stefano.

Running order

Week 6: The Switch – Up
The couples were required to switch professional partners this week and learn a new style of dance. Due to the nature of the week, no elimination took place at the end of the show. At the end of the show it was revealed that Anna & Rafał had the highest combined total of judges' scores and viewer votes, while Mateusz & Agnieszka had the lowest total.

Running order

Week 7: Marathon Night

Running order

Week 8: New Dance Styles

Running order

Week 9: Halloween Week

Running order

Week 10: Pop Week (Semi-final)

Running order

Dance-off

Running order

Week 11: Season Finale

Running order

Dance chart
The celebrities and professional partners danced one of these routines for each corresponding week:
Week 1 (Season Premiere): Cha-cha-cha, Waltz, Quickstep, Rumba, Jive, Tango, Foxtrot, Paso Doble, Viennese Waltz, Salsa, Contemporary, Charleston
Week 2 (Love Night): One unlearned dance
Week 3 (Latin Night): One unlearned dance (introducing Samba)
Week 4 (Most Memorable Year): One unlearned dance (introducing Swing, American Smooth)
Week 5 (Team Night): One unlearned dance and Team Freestyle
Week 6 (Partners Switch – Up): One unlearned dance (introducing Argentine Tango)
Week 7 (Marathon Night): One unlearned dance and Rock and Roll marathon
Week 8 (New Dance Styles): One repeated dance and one unlearned uncommon dance (Boogie-woogie, Dancehall, Bollywood, Hip-hop, Disco) 
Week 9 (Halloween Night): One unlearned dance and one repeated dance
Week 10 (Semi-final: Pop Night): One repeated dance, Pop dance and dance-off 
Week 11 (Season Finale): Couple's favorite dance of the season, judges' choice and Freestyle

 Highest scoring dance
 Lowest scoring dance
 Performed, but not scored

Call-out order

 This couple came in first place with the judges.
 This couple came in last place with the judges.
 This couple came in last place with the judges and was eliminated.
 This couple was eliminated.
 This couple won the competition.
 This couple came in second in the competition.
 This couple came in third in the competition.

Guest performances

Rating figures

References

External links
 

Season 15
2014 Polish television seasons